Marc Ziegler (born 13 June 1976) is a German former professional footballer who played as a goalkeeper.

He appeared in 103 Bundesliga games over the course of 14 seasons, mainly at the service of VfB Stuttgart (eight years). He also competed professionally in Turkey and Austria.

Career
Ziegler was born in Blieskastel.

VfB Stuttgart was immersed in a goalkeeping crisis after the defection of legendary Eike Immel to England's Manchester City in the 1995 summer. Youth graduate Ziegler – then 19 – won the battle for first-choice over longtime backup Eberhard Trautner and played all the season's matches save five, but the club finished tenth with the second-worst defensive record in the Bundesliga, only winning to Eintracht Frankfurt.

In the following three years Ziegler only appeared in 12 more games combined, eventually leaving club and country in 2000 after a brief spell at Arminia Bielefeld: he started in Turkey with Bursaspor, then left in January 2001 to Austria, where he was the starter for FC Tirol Innsbruck in back-to-back national championship conquests. In his second year he also stayed unbeaten for more than 1,000 minutes, coming close to an all-time European best.

Ziegler moved teams but stayed in the country in the 2002 summer, signing with FK Austria Wien, where he played rarely in two years, which were interspersed with a return to his country, at Hannover 96. In the next two seasons, back in Germany, he played with former youth side 1. FC Saarbrücken (second division) and Arminia again.

Ziegler signed with Borussia Dortmund for the 2007–08 campaign, and split first-choice duties with Roman Weidenfeller in that first year. On 29 January 2008, he saved a penalty kick from SV Werder Bremen's Diego – who had already beat him from the same spot – in the German Cup 2–1 home win; in the subsequent seasons, however, he was second-choice.

On 13 May 2010, 34-year-old Ziegler signed a three-year contract with former side Stuttgart, effective as of 1 July 2010. His input in his second spell consisted of two appearances in the 2010–11 UEFA Europa League, and he was released at the end of 2012–13.

Honours
FC Tirol Innsbruck
Austrian Bundesliga: 2000–01, 2001–02

1. FC Kaiserslautern
DFB-Pokal: 1996–97

VfB Stuttgart
UEFA Cup Winners' Cup: runner-up 1997–98
DFB-Ligapokal: runner-up 1997, 1998

Borussia Dortmund
DFB-Pokal: runner-up 2007–08

References

External links

1976 births
Living people
People from Saarpfalz-Kreis
German footballers
Association football goalkeepers
Bundesliga players
2. Bundesliga players
VfB Stuttgart players
VfB Stuttgart II players
Arminia Bielefeld players
Hannover 96 players
1. FC Saarbrücken players
Borussia Dortmund players
Süper Lig players
Bursaspor footballers
Austrian Football Bundesliga players
FC Tirol Innsbruck players
FK Austria Wien players
Germany under-21 international footballers
German expatriate footballers
Expatriate footballers in Austria
Expatriate footballers in Turkey
Footballers from Saarland
West German footballers
German expatriate sportspeople in Austria
German expatriate sportspeople in Turkey